The Southwest Border Security Consortium (SBSC) is a joint venture of nine U.S. universities in the states of Arizona, California, New Mexico and Texas to develop and promote scientific and policy solutions to issues facing the United States-Mexico border region.

The SBSC is also addressing border issues by offering a comprehensive, multi-institutional set of capabilities to relevant agencies such as the federal departments of Homeland Security, Defense, Energy and Transportation.

Members

Arizona
Arizona State University
University of Arizona

California
San Diego State University

New Mexico
New Mexico State University
New Mexico Institute of Mining and Technology (New Mexico Tech)
University of New Mexico

Texas
Texas A&M University
University of Texas at El Paso (UTEP)
University of Texas at San Antonio

See also
United States-Mexico border
Border
Border control

External links
The SBSC Announcement Brochure (2006)
Announcement, Homeland Security News Wire (Nov. 21, 2006)
Press Release, New Mexico Tech News (Tucson, AZ) (Nov. 13, 2006)

Mexico–United States border